Robert Forrest Kelly (12 March 1907, Edinburgh – 23 February 1975, Edinburgh) was a Scottish rugby union player.

He also went on the 1927 British Lions tour to Argentina.

References

1907 births
1975 deaths
Scottish rugby union players
Scotland international rugby union players
British & Irish Lions rugby union players from Scotland
Rugby union players from Edinburgh
Rugby union three-quarters